Love Equality is an advocacy organisation composed of six different civic society and LGBT charities to pursue the legalisation of same-sex marriage in Northern Ireland. Love Equality primarily operates within Northern Ireland and is led by National Union of Students-Union of Students in Ireland, Amnesty International, Rainbow Project, Irish Congress of Trade Unions, Cara-Friend and Here NI. It is the main campaigning organisation for marriage equality in Northern Ireland.

Love Equality was established in April 2016, eleven months after the passing of the Irish marriage equality referendum, 2015 which led to the Thirty-fourth Amendment of the Constitution of Ireland.

History of Love Equality 
The first pressure group established to campaign for marriage equality in Northern Ireland was called Equal Marriage NI, founded by activist Gary Spedding, and was composed of a number of voluntary organisations, political activists, charities and volunteers in 2011. The campaign pushed a number of political parties, including Sinn Féin, the Social Democratic and Labour Party and the cross-community Alliance party to give backing for change to the law in Northern Ireland. However, despite having some success in the midst of growing calls for marriage equality in the rest of the UK and Ireland, the campaigning organisation was basically defunct by 2012.

After the introduction of marriage equality in the Republic of Ireland in 2015 the six organisations of Rainbow Project, ICTU, NUS-USI, Amnesty International, Cara-Friend and Here NI came together to launch Love Equality in April 2016.

Notes and references

External links
 

LGBT political advocacy groups in the United Kingdom